Holly Smith may refer to:

Sportswomen
Holly Lincoln-Smith, Australian water polo player
Holly Smith (basketball), see Logan Thunder (WNBL)
Holly Smith (badminton), see India at the 2011 Commonwealth Youth Games and 2011 BWF World Junior Championships
Holly Smith (equestrian) (born 1989), British show jumper

Others
Holly Martin Smith, professor
Holly Smith, member of singing and dancing troupe The Golddiggers
Holly Smith, fictional character in Across the Great Divide (film), played by Heather Rattray
Holly Smith, beauty contestant (see Miss Colorado)
B. Holly Smith, biological anthropologist

See also
Hollie Smith, musician